Predrag "Pređo" Vušović (29 August 1960 – 17 February 2011) was a Croatian actor. He appeared in more than fifty films from 1983 to 2011.

Selected filmography

References

External links 

1960 births
2011 deaths
People from Kotor
Croats of Montenegro
Croatian male film actors
Croatian male television actors